Mir Naseebullah Khan is a Pakistani politician who is the current Provincial Minister of the Balochistan for Health, in office since 30 August 2018. He has been a member of Provincial Assembly of the Balochistan since August 2018.

Political career
He was elected to the Provincial Assembly of the Balochistan as a candidate of Pakistan Tehreek-e-Insaf (PTI) from Constituency PB-9 (Kohlu) in 2018 Pakistani general election.

On 27 August 2018, he was inducted into the provincial Balochistan cabinet of Chief Minister of Jam Kamal Khan. On 30 August, he was appointed as Provincial Minister of Balochistan for Health.

References

Living people
Pakistan Tehreek-e-Insaf MPAs (Balochistan)
Balochistan MPAs 2018–2023
Year of birth missing (living people)